The Madariyya is a Sufi order popular in North India, especially in Uttar Pradesh, the Mewat region, Bihar, Gujarat and West Bengal, as well as in Nepal and Bangladesh. Known for its syncretic aspects and its focus on internal dhikr, it was initiated by the Sufi saint Badi' al-Din ("Shah Madar"; d. 1434), and is centered on his shrine (dargah)  at Makanpur, Kanpur district, Uttar Pradesh.

Originating in the Tayfuriyya order rooted in the teachings of Bayazid Tayfur Bastami (9th century), the Madariyya order reached its zenith in the late Mughal period between the 15th and 17th centuries, and gave rise to new orders as Shah Madar's disciples spread through the northern plains of India, into Bengal.

Dargah
The Dargah, or the tomb of Badi' al-Din Shah Madar, is located at Makanpur, near Kanpur city, in Uttar Pradesh state, India. It is visited by thousands of visitors every month and especially during the annual Urs celebrations.

Prominent saints of the Madariyya order

 Sadan Shah Sarmast disciple of Zinda Shah Madar, Tomb in Gujarat
 Syed Akmal Husain Urf Babamaan disciple of Sadan Shah Sarmast, Tomb in Vadodara, Gujarat
 Chote Mast Dada disciple of Sadan Shah Sarmast, Tomb in Vadodara, Gujarat
 Syed Jamaluddin Janeman Jannati Madari R. A, Hilsa(jattipur), Bihar.

See also
 Jogi
 Moinuddin Chishti
 Ashraf Jahangir Semnani

References

Sufism in Pakistan
Sufism in India
Sufism in Bangladesh
Sufi orders